Capitanopsis is a genus of plants in the family Lamiaceae, first described in 1916. It contains six known species, all endemic to Madagascar.

Taxonomy

Phylogeny
In 2019, Paton et al.  published a summary cladogram for the subtribe Plectranthinae, based on an earlier 2018 study. The formerly recognized monotypic genera Dauphinea, Madlabium and Perrierastrum were found to form a clade with three species placed in Capitanopsis, so were transferred to that genus. Capitanopsis was a sister of the newly established genus Equilabium.

Species
Paton et al. (2018) recognize six species:
 Capitanopsis albida (Baker) Hedge
 Capitanopsis angustifolia (Moldenke) Capuron
 Capitanopsis brevilabra (Hedge) Mwany., A.J.Paton & Culham, syn. Dauphinea brevilabra
 Capitanopsis cloiselii S.Moore
 Capitanopsis magentea (Hedge) Mwany., A.J.Paton & Culham, syn. Madlabium magenteum
 Capitanopsis oreophila (Guillaumin) Mwany., A.J.Paton & Culham, syns. Plectanthus bipinnatus, Perrierastrum oreophilum

References

Lamiaceae
Lamiaceae genera
Endemic flora of Madagascar